

Overview
InvesTT is Trinidad and Tobago's national investment promotion agency, aligned with the Ministry of Trade and Industry. It focuses on the attraction of foreign direct investment in the country’s key non-energy sectors: 

 Innovative computer technology
 Logistics and distribution
 Maritime services
 Electricity intensive manufacturing and assembly

It works in partnership with investors from the beginning of their site selection processes to the establishment of fully operating businesses.

External links

Investment promotion agencies
Government agencies of Trinidad and Tobago